was the lead ship of the two  dreadnought battleships built for the Imperial Japanese Navy. Launched in 1914 and commissioned in 1915, she initially patrolled off the coast of China, playing no part in World War I. In 1923, she assisted survivors of the Great Kantō earthquake.

Fusō was modernized in 1930–1935 and again in 1937–1941, with improvements to her armor and propulsion machinery and a rebuilt superstructure in the pagoda mast style. With only  guns, she was outclassed by other Japanese battleships at the beginning of World War II, and played auxiliary roles for most of the war.

Fusō was part of Vice-Admiral Shōji Nishimura's Southern Force at the Battle of Leyte Gulf. She was sunk in the early hours of 25 October 1944 by torpedoes and naval gunfire during the Battle of Surigao Strait. Some reports claimed Fusō broke in half, and that both halves remained afloat and burning for an hour; according to survivors' accounts, however, the ship sank after 40 minutes of flooding and caught fire when her fuel bunkers spilled open. Of the few dozen crewmen who escaped, only 10 survived to return to Japan.

Description

Her crew consisted of 1,198 officers and enlisted men in 1915 and 1,396 in 1935. During World War II, the crew probably totalled around 1,800–1,900 men.

During the ship's first modernization during 1930–1933, her forward superstructure was enlarged with multiple platforms added to her tripod foremast. Her rear superstructure was rebuilt to accommodate mounts for  anti-aircraft (AA) guns and additional fire-control directors. Fusō was also given torpedo bulges to improve her underwater protection and to compensate for the weight of the additional armor and equipment.

Propulsion
The ship had two sets of Brown-Curtis direct-drive steam turbines, each of which drove two propeller shafts.

During her first modernization, the Miyahara boilers were replaced by six new Kampon oil-fired boilers fitted in the former aft boiler room, and the forward funnel was removed.

Armament
The twelve 45-caliber 14-inch guns of Fusō were mounted in six twin-gun turrets, numbered one through six from front to rear, each with an elevation range of −5 to +30 degrees. The turrets were arranged in an uncommon 2-1-1-2 style with superfiring pairs of turrets fore and aft; the middle turrets were not superfiring, and had a funnel between them. Initially, the guns could fire at a rate of 1.5 rounds per minute, and this was also improved during her first modernization. The orientation of Turret No. 3 was reversed during the modernization; it now faced forward.

Originally, Fusō was fitted with a secondary armament of sixteen 50-caliber six-inch 41st Year Type guns mounted in casemates on the upper sides of the hull. She was fitted with five 40-caliber three-inch (76 mm) AA guns in 1918. The high-angle guns were in single mounts on both sides of the forward superstructure and both sides of the second funnel, as well as on the port side of the aft superstructure. The ship was also fitted with six submerged  torpedo tubes, three on each broadside.

During the first phase of Fusōs modernization of the early 1930s, all five three-inch guns were removed and replaced with eight 40-caliber 127-millimeter dual-purpose guns, fitted on both sides of the fore and aft superstructures in four twin-gun mounts. Their maximum rate of fire was 14 rounds a minute, but their sustained rate of fire was around eight rounds per minute. At this time, the ship was also provided with four quadruple mounts for the license-built Type 93 13.2 mm machine guns, two on the pagoda mast and one on each side of the funnel. The cyclic rate was adjustable between 425 and 475 rounds per minute, but the need to change 30-round magazines reduced the effective rate to 250 rounds per minute.

During this same phase, the Type 93  machine guns were replaced by eight 25 mm Type 96 light AA guns in twin-gun mounts. Four of these mounts were fitted on the forward superstructure, one on each side of the funnel and two on the rear superstructure. This was the standard Japanese light AA gun during World War II, but it suffered from severe design shortcomings that rendered it a largely ineffective weapon. According to historian Mark Stille, the twin and triple mounts "lacked sufficient speed in train or elevation; the gun sights were unable to handle fast targets; the gun exhibited excessive vibration; the magazine was too small, and, finally, the gun produced excessive muzzle blast". The configuration of the AA guns varied significantly; in July 1943, 17 single and two twin-mounts were added for a total of 37. In July 1944, the ship was fitted with additional AA guns: 23 single, six twin and eight triple-mounts, for a total of 95 in her final configuration. The maximum effective rate of fire was only between 110 and 120 rounds per minute because of the frequent need to change the fifteen-round magazines.

Armor
The barbettes of the turrets were protected by armor 305 mm thick, while the casemates of the 152 mm guns were protected by 152 mm armor plates. The vessel contained 737 watertight compartments (574 underneath the armor deck, 163 above) to preserve buoyancy in the event of battle damage.

During her first reconstruction Fusōs armor was substantially upgraded.

Aircraft
Fusō was briefly fitted with an aircraft flying-off platform on Turret No. 2 in 1924. During the first phase of her first modernization, a catapult was fitted on the roof of Turret No. 3 and the ship was equipped to operate three floatplanes, although no hangar was provided. The initial Nakajima E4N2 biplanes were replaced by Nakajima E8N2 biplanes in 1938. Fusōs ability to operate her aircraft was greatly improved during the second phase of her second modernization in 1940–41 when the aircraft handling equipment was moved to the stern and a new catapult was installed. Mitsubishi F1M biplanes replaced the E8Ns from 1942 on.

Fire control and sensors
When completed in 1915, Fusō had two  and two  rangefinders in her forward superstructure, a  rangefinder on the roof of Turret No. 2, and 4.5-meter rangefinders in Turrets 3, 4, and 5. In late 1917 a fire-control director was installed on a platform on the foremast. The 4.5-meter rangefinders were replaced by  instruments in 1923. During the ship's first modernization, four directors for the 12.7 mm AA guns were added, one each on each side of the fore and aft superstructures, and an eight-meter rangefinder was installed at the top of the pagoda mast. This was replaced by a  rangefinder during 1938. At this same time, the two 3.5-meter rangefinders on the forward superstructure were replaced by directors for the 25 mm AA guns. Additional 25 mm directors were installed on platforms on each side of the funnel.

While in drydock in July 1943, Type 21 air search radar was installed on the roof of the 10-meter rangefinder at the top of the pagoda mast. In August 1944, two Type 22 surface search radar units were installed on the pagoda mast and two Type 13 early warning radar units were fitted on the funnel. Fusō was the only Japanese battleship to mount radar on her funnel.

Construction and service

Given a classical name for Japan, Fusō was laid down at the Kure Naval Arsenal on 11 March 1912 and launched on 28 March 1914. She was commissioned on 8 November 1915 and assigned to the 1st Division,  of the 1st Fleet on 13 December under the command of Captain Kōzō Satō. The ship did not take part in any combat during World War I, as there were no longer any forces of the Central Powers in Asia by the time she was completed; she patrolled off the coast of China during that time. The ship served as the flagship of the 1st Division during 1917 and 1918. During the ship's period in reserve in 1918, five 76.2 mm anti-aircraft guns were installed. She aided survivors of the Great Kantō earthquake between 9 and 22 September 1923. Captain Mitsumasa Yonai assumed command on 1 July 1924 and was relieved on 1 November by Captain Sankichi Takahashi. In the 1920s, Fusō conducted training off the coast of China and was often placed in reserve.

The first phase of the ship's first modernization began on 12 April 1930 at the Yokosuka Naval Arsenal; machinery was replaced, armor was reinforced, and torpedo bulges were fitted. Fusō arrived on 26 September 1932 at Kure Naval Arsenal, where her armament was upgraded and her torpedo tubes were removed. Her sea trials began on 12 May 1933, and the second phase of her modernization began less than a year later. The ship's stern was lengthened and work was completed in March 1935. Captain Jinichi Kusaka was assigned command from November 1935 to December 1936. After sporadic use for training for the next two years, Fusō was assigned as a training ship in 1936 and 1937.

Fusō began the first phase of her second modernization on 26 February 1937, and Captain Hiroaki Abe assumed command on 1 December. He was relieved by Captain Ruitaro Fujita on 1 April 1938, the day after this phase of her modernization was completed. The ship was again assigned to the 1st Division of the 1st Fleet on 15 November. She briefly operated in Chinese waters in early 1939 before the second phase of her second modernization began on 12 December 1940. This was completed on 10 April 1941, and Fusō was assigned to the 2nd Division of the 1st Fleet. Captain Mitsuo Kinoshita assumed command on 15 September, when the division consisted of the two Fusō-class and the two s.

World War II

On 10 April 1941, Fusō was assigned to the 2nd Division of the 1st Fleet. On 21 February 1942, the ship returned to the shipyard at Kure to replace her gun barrels, departing on 25 February. Together with the rest of the 2nd Battleship Division, she pursued but did not catch the American carrier force that had launched the Doolittle Raid on 18 April 1942.

Fusō and the rest of the 2nd Battleship Division set sail on 28 May 1942 with the Aleutian Support Group at the same time that most of the Imperial Fleet began an attack on Midway Island (Operation MI). Commanded by Vice-Admiral Shirō Takasu, the division was composed of Japan's four oldest battleships, including Fusō, accompanied by two light cruisers, 12 destroyers, and two oilers. Official records do not show the division as part of the larger Midway operation, known as Operation AL; they were to accompany the fleet under Admiral Isoroku Yamamoto, but were only to provide support to the Aleutian task force if needed.

On 14 June, Fusō returned to Yokosuka and arrived back at Hashirajima on 24 June. In an effort to replace the aircraft carriers lost at the Battle of Midway, the navy made plans to convert the two Fusō-class ships to hybrid battleship-carriers, but the two Ise-class battleships were chosen instead. The ship was assigned to the Imperial Japanese Naval Academy at Etajima, Hiroshima, for use as a training ship between 15 November 1942 and 15 January 1943. Captain Keizō Komura assumed command on 5 December, and was relieved by Captain Nobumichi Tsuruoka on 1 June the next year. Seven days later, Fusō rescued 353 survivors from Mutsu when that ship exploded at Hashirajima.

Between 18 and 24 July 1943, the ship was at the Kure drydock for fitting of radar and additional 25 mm AA guns. Fusō sailed from the Inland Sea on 18 August for Truk Naval Base, carrying supplies, and arrived five days later. The Japanese had intercepted American radio traffic that suggested an attack on Wake Island, and on 17 October, Fusō and the bulk of the 1st Fleet sailed for Eniwetok to be in a position to intercept any such attack. The fleet arrived on the 19th, departed four days later, and arrived back at Truk on 26 October.

On 1 February 1944, Fusō departed Truk with Nagato to avoid an American air raid, and arrived at Palau on 4 February. They left on 16 February to escape another air raid. The ships arrived on 21 February at Lingga Island, and Fusō was employed there as a training ship. A week later, Captain Masami Ban relieved Tsuruoka. The ship was refitted at Singapore between 13 and 27 April, and returned to Lingga. She was transferred to Tawi-Tawi on 11 May and provided cover for the convoy that failed to reinforce Biak Island at the end of the month. Fusō transferred to Tarakan Island off Borneo to refuel in early July before returning to Japan and escaping an attack by the submarine . In early August at Kure, she was refitted with additional radars and light AA guns. Fusō and her sister ship were transferred to Battleship Division 2 of the 2nd Fleet on 10 September, and Fusō became the flagship of the division under the command of Vice-Admiral Shōji Nishimura on 23 September. They departed Kure on 23 September for Lingga, escaping an attack by the submarine  the next day, and arrived on 4 October, where Nishimura transferred his flag to Yamashiro. The ships then transferred to Brunei to refuel in preparation for Operation Shō-Gō, the attempt to destroy the American fleet conducting the invasion of Leyte.

Battle of Surigao Strait

Commanded by Rear Admiral Masami Ban, Fusō left Brunei at 15:30 on 22 October 1944 as part of Nishimura's Southern Force, heading east into the Sulu Sea and then northeast into the Mindanao Sea. Intending to join Vice-Admiral Takeo Kurita's force in Leyte Gulf, the force passed west of Mindanao Island into Surigao Strait, where it met a large force of battleships and cruisers lying in wait. The Battle of Surigao Strait became the southernmost action in the Battle of Leyte Gulf.

At 09:08 on 24 October, Fusō, Yamashiro, and the heavy cruiser Mogami spotted a group of 27 planes, including Grumman TBF Avenger torpedo bombers and Curtiss SB2C Helldiver dive bombers escorted by Grumman F6F Hellcat fighters from the carrier . A bomb from one of them destroyed the catapult and both floatplanes. Another bomb hit the ship near Turret No. 2 and penetrated the decks, killing everyone in No. 1 secondary battery; the ship began to list 2 degrees to starboard. Early the next morning, Fusō opened fire around 01:05 after a shape was spotted off the port bow; it turned out to be Mogami; Fusōs fire killed three sailors in that ship's sick bay.

One or two torpedoes, possibly fired by the destroyer , hit Fusō amidships on the starboard side at 03:09 on the 25th; she listed to starboard, slowed down, and fell out of formation. Some Japanese and American eyewitnesses later claimed Fusō broke in half, and that both halves remained afloat and burning for an hour, but they specifically mentioned only the size of the fire on the water, and not any details of the ship. Historian John Toland agreed in 1970 that Fusō had broken in two, but according to historian Anthony Tully in 2009:

Fusō sank between 03:38 and 03:50, releasing a large quantity of oil which ignited on the surface as she went down; only a few dozen men survived the rapid sinking and subsequent oil fire. There is evidence that some of these were rescued by the destroyer , which was itself sunk a short time later; it is also possible that some who escaped the sinking reached Leyte only to be killed by Filipinos, as is known to have happened to survivors from other Japanese warships sunk in the Battle of Surigao Strait. Ten crew members are known to have survived, all of whom returned to Japan. The total number of casualties is estimated at 1,620 sailors.

Fusō was removed from the navy list on 31 August 1945.

Wreck

 discovered the wreck of Fusō on 25 November 2017. The pagoda mast broke off during the sinking and is some distance away from the wreck.

Notes

Footnotes

References

External links

 Anthony Tully, "Shell Game at Surigao: The entangled fates of battleships Fuso and Yamashiro", 1999
“Paul Allen’s Petrel project wins spotlight in TV show about Pacific War shipwrecks”
“Drain the Oceans Season 2, Episode 8, Pacific War Megaships”

Fusō-class battleships
Shipwrecks in the Surigao Strait
World War I battleships of Japan
Second Sino-Japanese War naval ships of Japan
World War II battleships of Japan
World War II shipwrecks in the Pacific Ocean
1914 ships
Maritime incidents in October 1944
Shipwreck discoveries by Paul Allen
2017 archaeological discoveries
World War II shipwrecks in the Philippine Sea
Ships built by Kure Naval Arsenal